Novye Vikri is a rural locality (a selo) and the administrative centre of Novovikrinsky Selsoviet, Kayakentsky District, Republic of Dagestan, Russia. The population was 3,338 as of 2010. There are 45 streets.

Geography 
Novye Vikri is located 15 km south of Novokayakent (the district's administrative centre) by road. Krasnopartizansk and Gerga are the nearest rural localities.

Nationalities 
Dargins live there.

References 

Rural localities in Kayakentsky District